The following is a list of titles and awards won by National Rugby League club, the Penrith Panthers.

Team honours

Premierships

Runners-up

Minor Premierships

Wooden Spoon

World Club Challenges

Finals appearances 
1985, 1988, 1989, 1990, 1991, 1997, 2000, 2003, 2004, 2010, 2014, 2016, 2017, 2018, 2020, 2021.

Individual awards

Club awards
The Player of the Year award is named the Merv Cartwright Medal. The Rookie of the Year award is named after Ben Alexander.

References 

Honours
Rugby league trophies and awards
National Rugby League lists
Sydney-sport-related lists